Menriq, Mendriq or Minriq is an aboriginal Mon–Khmer language of Malaysia.

References

Further reading 
Bradley, David (2007). Languages of Mainland South-East Asia. In The Vanishing Languages of the Pacific Rim. p. 301-336. Oxford University Press.

External links 
 http://projekt.ht.lu.se/rwaai RWAAI (Repository and Workspace for Austroasiatic Intangible Heritage)
 http://hdl.handle.net/10050/00-0000-0000-0003-6700-2@view Menriq in RWAAI Digital Archive

 Languages of Malaysia
 Aslian languages